Élisa Flore de Almeida (born 11 January 1998) is a French professional footballer who plays as a defender for Division 1 Féminine club Paris Saint-Germain and the France national team.

Club career
On 9 July 2021, Paris Saint-Germain announced the signing of de Almeida on a three-year deal.

International career
Born in France, de Almeida is of Portuguese descent. She is a former French youth international. She made her senior team debut for France on 4 October 2019 in a 4–0 friendly win over Iceland.

Career statistics

Club

International

Scores and results list France's goal tally first, score column indicates score after each de Almeida goal.

Honours
Paris Saint-Germain
 Coupe de France féminine: 2021–22

References

External links
 
 
 
 

1998 births
Living people
People from Châtenay-Malabry
Women's association football defenders
French women's footballers
France women's youth international footballers
France women's international footballers
French people of Portuguese descent
Division 1 Féminine players
Paris FC (women) players
Montpellier HSC (women) players
Paris Saint-Germain Féminine players
Footballers from Hauts-de-Seine